Teal Line may refer to:

 Line 4 (Beijing Subway)
 Daxing line
 Shanghai maglev train
 Line 8 (Guangzhou Metro)
 Airport Express (MTR)
 Line 6 (Kunming Metro)
 Line 6 (Shenyang Metro)
 Line 18 (Chengdu Metro)

See also 
 Green Line (disambiguation)
 Blue Line (disambiguation)
 Turquoise Line (disambiguation) or Blue Green Line